Jordan Wall (born August 1, 1981) is an American actor. He is best known for his role as Joe Talbot in the children's public television show Wishbone (1995-1998). He is not the real-life son of actress Mary Chris Wall, who played Joe's mother, Ellen Talbot, on Wishbone, but the son of Graydon and Diane Wall.

Filmography

References

1981 births
Living people
American male television actors
Male actors from Texas